College of Management, Mahidol University, also known as CMMU, is the business school of Mahidol University, located in Bangkok, Thailand. Established in 1997, CMMU offers master's and Ph.D. degree programmes in management studies.

Programmes
CMMU currently runs international and Thai programmes in various management disciplines.

International programmes
Human resource management
Entrepreneurship management
Financial management
General management
Innovation in management
Marketing and management
New technology ventures
PhD in management

Thai programmes
Business management
Entrepreneurship and innovation
Finance
Human capital and organisation management
Management and strategy
Marketing

International partnerships
CMMU runs international exchange programmes with universities including Universite catholique de Louvain (Belgium), The University of Nancy and Bordeaux Management School (France), Saarland University (Saarbrücken, Germany), Kingston Business School (Kingston upon Thames, UK), Copenhagen Business School (Denmark), Shanghai University (China), Sungkyunkwan University (Seoul, South Korea), and Sophia University (Tokyo, Japan).

References

External links
 Official website

Mahidol University
Educational institutions established in 1997
University departments in Thailand
1997 establishments in Thailand